AS Saint-Etienne won Division 1 season 1975/1976 of the French Association Football League with 57 points.

Participating teams

 Olympique Avignonnais
 SEC Bastia
 Bordeaux
 RC Lens
 Lille
 Olympique Lyonnais
 Olympique de Marseille
 FC Metz
 AS Monaco
 AS Nancy
 FC Nantes
 OGC Nice
 Nîmes Olympique
 Paris Saint-Germain FC
 Stade de Reims
 AS Saint-Etienne
 FC Sochaux-Montbéliard
 RC Strasbourg
 Troyes AF
 US Valenciennes-Anzin

League table

Promoted from Division 2, who will play in Division 1 season 1976/1977
 Angers SCO: Champion of Division 2, winner of Division 2 group B
 Stade Rennais FC: Runner-up, winner of Division 2 group A
 Stade Lavallois: Third place, winner of barrages

Results

Top goalscorers

References

 Division 1 season 1975-1976 at pari-et-gagne.com

Ligue 1 seasons
French
1